The discography of Jet, an Australian rock band formed in 2001, consists of 3 studio albums, 1 live albums, 1 compilation albums, 2 extended plays and 14 singles.

Albums

Studio albums

Live albums

Compilation albums

Video albums

Extended plays

Singles

Notes

Music videos

Other appearances

References

Alternative rock discographies
Discographies of Australian artists
Rock music group discographies